Pukchang Airport(북창비행장) is an airport in Pyongan-namdo, North Korea. It serves as the military airfield for the nearby city of Sunchon.

Facilities 
The airfield has a single concrete runway 14/32 measuring 8150 x 164 feet (2484 x 50 m).  It has several aprons and taxiway leading to both revetments and underground aircraft storage.  It is home to a fighter regiment of Mikoyan-Gurevich MiG-23 jets.

Missile testing
The airfield was used to test-launch a Hwasong-12 intermediate-range ballistic missile on April 28, 2017, with the missile subsequently crashing into Chongsin-dong, Tokchon.

References 

Airports in North Korea
South Pyongan